F-2, or 6-(2-aminopropyl)-5-methoxy-2-methyl-2,3-dihydrobenzofuran, is a lesser-known psychedelic drug. F-2 was first synthesized by Alexander Shulgin. In his book PiHKAL, the minimum dosage is listed as 15 mg, and the duration unknown. F-2 produces few to no effects at this dose in humans. Animal studies showed it to substitute for the psychedelic drug DOM, but with less than one tenth the potency.

Legality

United Kingdom
This substance is a Class A drug in the Drugs controlled by the UK Misuse of Drugs Act.

See also 
 F-22 (psychedelic)
 Substituted benzofuran

References 

Psychedelic phenethylamines
6-Benzofuranethanamines
Benzofuran ethers at the benzene ring
Hydroquinone ethers